Oslo Bazaars (Basarene Kirkeristen)  are located at Oslo Cathedral, along the streets Karl Johans gate and Dronningens gate in Oslo, Norway. The buildings of the bazaar constitute a continuous facility that encircles three sides of the quarter with Oslo Cathedral.

History

The building of the bazaars were under construction from 1841 until 1859. The buildings have facades of untreated red bricks.  The buildings were designed in Romanesque Revival architecture style by Christian Heinrich Grosch who acted as the city's chief architect, planning engineer, and building inspector. They were originally built for butchers selling meat at the nearby market place Stortorvet. Later when this proved insufficient, construction continued along the same design in a semicircle east of the church, with more than 50 stalls in total.

In several occasions, the buildings were considered for demolition as part of a beautification plan for Oslo Cathedral. In 1927, the Oslo City Council voted against demolition supported by the arguments of architect Harald Hals (1876–1959) who served as chief of city planning from 1926 to 1947. Today the bazaar halls are listed as a protected site.

Gallery

See also
 Bazaar
 Market (place)
 Retail

References

Bazaars
1841 establishments in Norway
Romanesque Revival architecture